Dorcadion sturmii is a species of beetle in the family Cerambycidae. It was first described by Frivaldsky in 1837. It is known from Bulgaria and Turkey, and possibly North Macedonia.

Varietas
 Dorcadion sturmii var. albofasciatum Breuning, 1946
 Dorcadion sturmii var. albotomentosum Breuning, 1946
 Dorcadion sturmii var. fulvofasciatum Breuning, 1946

References

sturmii
Beetles described in 1837